Orchard Mesa is a census-designated place (CDP) in and governed by Mesa County, Colorado, United States. It is part of the Grand Junction, CO Metropolitan Statistical Area. The population of the Orchard Mesa CDP was 6,688 at the 2020 census. The Grand Junction post office (ZIP Code 81503) serves the area.

Geography
Orchard Mesa is in central Mesa County, on the southeast side of the city of Grand Junction, the county seat. It is bordered to the north by the Colorado River and to the southwest by the Gunnison River, its tributary. U.S. Route 50 passes through the community, leading northwest into Grand Junction and southeast  to Delta.

Demographics

See also

 List of census-designated places in Colorado

References

External links

 Mesa County website

Census-designated places in Mesa County, Colorado
Census-designated places in Colorado